Acrolophus boucardi is a moth of the family Acrolophidae. It is found in Mexico.

References

boucardi
Moths described in 1901